Lyman Raion was a raion (district) in Odesa Oblast of Ukraine. Its administrative center was the urban-type settlement of Dobroslav. The raion was abolished and its territory was merged into Odesa Raion on 18 July 2020 as part of the administrative reform of Ukraine, which reduced the number of raions of Odesa Oblast to seven.  The last estimate of the raion population was 

On 21 May 2016, Verkhovna Rada adopted decision to rename Kominternivske Raion to Lyman Raion and Kominternivske to Dobroslav according to the law prohibiting names of Communist origin.

References

External links

Former raions of Odesa Oblast
1923 establishments in Ukraine
Ukrainian raions abolished during the 2020 administrative reform